This article describes the qualifying phase for gymnastics at the 2024 Summer Olympics. A total of 318 gymnasts (192 in artistic, 94 in rhythmic and 32 in trampoline) will qualify.

The qualification pathway for the 2024 Summer Olympics is significantly simplified and modified from those in 2020. In the artistic team event, a maximum of five gymnasts will be eligible to participate as opposed to the four per team and two individuals who competed in Tokyo 2020. Three teams who finish on the podium qualify for the Olympics through the 2022 World Artistic Gymnastics Championships in Liverpool with a large proportion of quota places distributed at the same meet in Antwerp, Belgium by the following year. The 2024 World Cup series will also hand the gymnasts an opportunity to earn more spots in separate apparatus events.

In rhythmic gymnastics, the 2022 World Championships, scheduled for 14 to 18 September in Sofia, Bulgaria, will witness individual and group all-around medalists book their tickets in Paris. Most quota places will be allocated at the same meet in Valencia, Spain by the following year with fourteen individual gymnasts and five nations across all continents vying for qualification.

Half of the trampoline qualifying slots will be awarded to the highest-ranked gymnasts at the 2023 World Championships in Birmingham with the majority coming from the 2023–2024 World Cup series. Across all gymnastics disciplines, the remaining places will be offered to the gymnasts vying for qualification at their respective continental meets.

Qualification summary

Timeline

Artistic

Men's

Teams

Individuals

Women's

Teams

Individuals

Rhythmic

Individual all-around

Group all-around

Trampoline

Men's

Women's

Notes

References 

Qualification for the 2024 Summer Olympics